Mothers and Sons is a play by Terrence McNally, which opened on Broadway in 2014.

Production history
Mothers and Sons had its world premiere at the Bucks County Playhouse, Pennsylvania, in June 2013. Directed by Sheryl Kaller, the cast starred Tyne Daly, Manoel Felciano and Bobby Steggert.

Mothers and Sons opened on Broadway at the John Golden Theatre on March 24, 2014, after previews from February 23, 2014. Directed by Sheryl Kaller, the cast stars Tyne Daly as Katharine Gerard, Fred Weller (Cal), Bobby Steggert (Will) and Grayson Taylor (Bud). The scenic design is by John Lee Beatty, costumes by Jess Goldstein, lighting by Jeff Croiter and sound by Nevin Steinberg. The play closed on June 22, 2014 after 104 performances and 33 previews.

Regional and International
The play was produced by the Philadelphia Theatre Company from February 6, 2015 to March 8, 2015, directed by Wendy C. Goldberg and starring Michael Learned as Katherine Gerard. It ran at Speakeasy Stage Company in Boston from May 8, 2015 to June 6, 2015. The Aux Dog Theatre in Albuquerque, New Mexico presented the play from February 22, 2015 to March 15, 2015.

The play ran  in Argentina since May 11. The play was produced by Ensemble Theatre in Sydney from August 21 to September 27, 2015.

The play opened February 10, 2016 in Columbus, Ohio, produced by CATCO and closed February 28, 2016.

Overview
The play takes place 20 years after the events in McNally's 1990 television play Andre's Mother.

Katharine Gerard lost her son to AIDS 20 years ago, and now Katherine visits her son's partner, Cal, who has married Will. The two attempt to reconcile.

Critical reception

Ben Brantley, reviewing in The New York Times, wrote: " 'Mothers and Sons'... is, in essence, a debate play with fraught emotional underpinnings, and it doesn’t avoid the stasis of that genre. It also tends to sabotage its potential to move us by making the debate, rather than psychological credibility, its first priority.... Ms. Daly...again proves herself one of our most formidable stage actresses.... She and the play are at their strongest, though, not in what is spoken, however articulately, but in tacitly suggesting a sorrow beyond words that is always waiting to resurface."

Chris Jones, in his review for the Chicago Tribune wrote that the play is "moving, intensely resonant". He noted that "To a large extent, McNally is chronicling the revolutionary changes he has seen in the lives of gay Americans — and what playwright has more right to do so?"

Original cast
Katharine—Tyne Daly 
Will Ogden—Bobby Steggert 
Cal Porter—Frederick Weller 
Bud Ogden-Porter—Grayson Taylor

Awards and nominations
Mothers and Sons was nominated for two 2014 Drama League Awards, for Outstanding Production Of A Broadway Or Off-Broadway Play and Distinguished Performance Award (Tyne Daly). Tyne Daly was nominated for the Drama Desk Award, Outstanding Actress in a Play.

The play received two 2014 Tony Award nominations: Best Play and Best Performance by an Actress in a Leading Role in a Play
(Tyne Daly).

References

External links

 (archive)

2013 plays
Broadway plays
LGBT-related plays
Plays by Terrence McNally